Jacob Dirk "Jaap" Zielhuis (born 2 July 1966 in Heerde) is a sailor from the Netherlands. Zielhuis represented his country at the 2004 Summer Olympics in Athens. Zielhuis took 19th place in the Finn. During the Sydney Olympics 2000 Zielhuis was coach of the Dutch Olympic Sailing Team.

Nowadays Zielhuis is coach of the Dutch Olympic Sailing Team.

Further reading

2000 Olympics (Sydney)

2004 Olympics (Athens)

References

Living people
1966 births
People from Heerde
Dutch male sailors (sport)
Sailors at the 2004 Summer Olympics – Finn
Olympic sailors of the Netherlands
Sportspeople from Gelderland